"Every Day" is a single by Swedish DJ and producer, Eric Prydz. It was released by digital download on 15 October 2012 through Pryda Recordings as first single from the album Opus. The song has peaked to number 61 in the Netherlands. "Every Day" contains an interpolation of "Everyday" (2002) by American house producer John Ciafone.

Track listing

Credits and personnel
Eric Prydz – songwriter, producer, programming, instrumentation
John Ciafone – songwriter
Lemuel Springsteen – songwriter
Daniel Pearce – vocals, backing vocals
Hal Ritson – backing vocals, vocal producer

Credits adapted from DR.

Chart performance

Weekly charts

Year-end charts

Release history

References

2012 singles
Eric Prydz songs
2012 songs
Virgin Records singles
Songs written by Eric Prydz